The Public Works Department  was a government agency which operated in Victoria between 1855 and 1987.

Over its long history, the department had various responsibilities, many of which were later devolved to other departments or authorities. These included:

Building and government accommodation services and supply of stores, furniture and equipment until 1987
Cemeteries until 1873 
Furniture and equipment up to 1987
Licences for the occupation of unused roads and water frontages
Local government between 1855 and 1958 
Main roads and bridges between 1877 and 1913
Marina permits until 1987
Metropolitan foreshores until 1956 and between 1974 and 1983
Ports and harbours between 1900 and 1983  which, for periods of time, included fisheries and aspects of immigration and the Alfred Graving Dock
Preservation of historic buildings until 1973, with preservation of historic government buildings continuing until 1983
Property and accommodation management  until 1985
Tourist resorts and facilities between about 1922 and 1958
Water supply (metropolitan) and sewerage between 1855 and 1891
Water supply (rural)  from 1860 and 1867
Wire netting advances until 1928

The department was abolished in 1987, with all major functions taken up by the newly created Ministry of Housing and Construction (Victoria).

References

Economic history of Victoria (Australia)
Former government departments of Victoria (Australia)
1855 establishments in Australia
1987 disestablishments in Australia